IIE may stand for:

 The Independent Institute of Education, South Africa
 Innovative Interstellar Explorer, a proposed mission to send a probe to the heliopause
 Institut d'Informatique d'Entreprise, French public Grandes écoles specializing in computer science
 Institute for International Economics, economics think tank based in Washington, D.C.
 Institute of Industrial Engineers, world's largest professional society for industrial engineering professionals
 Institute of International Education, a world leader in the international exchange of people and ideas
 Institution of Incorporated Engineers, once the UK's largest multidisciplinary engineering association, now part of IET
 Instituto de Investigaciones Estéticas, art history research institute at Mexico's National Autonomous University (UNAM)
 The Apple IIe, the third model in Apple's line of Apple II computers

See also
 2E (disambiguation), including a list of topics named II-E, etc.